The Women's 100 metres at the 2011 World Championships in Athletics was held at the Daegu Stadium on August 27, 28 and 29.

Prior to the championships, American Carmelita Jeter held the fastest time of the year (10.70 seconds) and the 2009 bronze medalist entered the competition as the second fastest woman of all-time. Veronica Campbell-Brown, the 2007 champion, was the next fastest athlete (10.76) and the only woman to have beaten Jeter that year. The reigning world and Olympic champion, Shelly-Ann Fraser-Pryce was also in contention, although her preparations were affected by injury. Marshevet Myers, Kerron Stewart, and Kelly-Ann Baptiste were ranked in the top five for the 100 m before the race.

In the final, Jeter got out of the blocks with Fraser-Pryce, who is known for her fast starts.  The two were even through the first half of the race until Jeter pulled away for a clear win.  Fast closing Campbell-Brown and Baptiste edged past Fraser-Pryce at the finish.

Medalists

Records
Prior to the competition, the records were as follows:

Qualification standards

Schedule

Results

Preliminary round
Qualification: First 3 in each heat (Q) and the next 4 fastest (q) advance to the heats.

Wind:Heat 1: -0.1 m/s, Heat 2: -0.5 m/s, Heat 3: +1.8 m/s, Heat 4: +1.8 m/s, Heat 5: -1.3 m/s

Heats
Qualification: First 3 in each heat (Q) and the next 3 fastest (q) advance to the semifinals.

Wind:Heat 1: +0.3 m/s, Heat 2: +1.4 m/s, Heat 3: +1.0 m/s, Heat 4: +0.1 m/s, Heat 5: +0.9 m/s, Heat 6: +2.2 m/s, Heat 7: +0.5 m/s

Semifinals
Qualification: First 2 in each heat (Q) and the next 2 fastest (q) advance to the final.

Wind:Heat 1: -1.3 m/s, Heat 2: -1.4 m/s, Heat 3: -1.5 m/s

Final
Wind: -1.4 m/s

References

External links
100 metres results at IAAF website

100
100 metres at the World Athletics Championships
2011 in women's athletics